Daniel Escoto is a Mexican professional stock car racing driver. He competes full-time in the ARCA Menards Series East, driving the No. 60 Chevrolet SS for Josh Williams Motorsports.

Racing career

ARCA Menards Series East 
Escoto made his ARCA Menards Series East debut in 2022. Escoto was entered into the Race to Stop Suicide 200 at New Smyrna Speedway, but due to an illness, Logan Misuraca ran the race in his place. He debuted in the following race, the Pensacola 200 at Five Flags Speedway, finishing 4th, in order for his full-season.

Motorsports career results

ARCA Menards Series East

References

External links 

Living people
ARCA Menards Series drivers
NASCAR drivers
Mexican racing drivers
Year of birth missing (living people)